Chasmopodium caudatum is a species of swamp grass native to central and western Africa.

References

Andropogoneae
Flora of West Tropical Africa
Taxa named by Eduard Hackel